The NCAA Men's Tennis Championships are annual tournaments held in the spring to crown team, singles, and doubles champions in American college tennis. The first intercollegiate championship was held in 1883, 23 years before the founding of the NCAA, with Harvard's Joseph Clark taking the singles title. The same year Clark partnered to Howard Taylor to win the doubles title.

Since 1963, the NCAA organizes separate tournaments for Division I and II. A tournament for Division III was added in 1973. The NCAA discontinued the Division II singles and doubles championships in 1995.

From 1946 to 1976, players' individual performances were awarded points which were tallied to determine the NCAA "team" champion. In 1977, the NCAA began a dual-match single-elimination team tournament with 16 schools to determine the team championship. Subsequently, expanded to include byes for 12 teams in the first round, the team tournament adopted its current 64-team single-elimination format in 1999.

The University of Virginia won the most recent Division I national team championship in 2022, defeating the University of Kentucky, 4-0, in the final. Florida's Ben Shelton captured the singles championship, and Texas's Cleeve Harper and Richard Ciamarra won the doubles championship. Barry University won the Division II national championship. The University of Chicago won the Division III national team championship; Stan Morris of Middlebury College captured the singles title, and Case Western Reserve University`s James Hopper and Jonathan Powell won the doubles title.

Team champions

Individual champions
The NCAA was founded in 1906.  The first tennis championship sponsored by the NCAA was in 1946.  
Individual championships were not held in 1917–18.

Singles

† First championship sponsored by NCAA

Doubles

† First championship sponsored by NCAA

Records 
The following is a list of National Collegiate Athletic Association (NCAA) Division I college tennis individual statistics and records through the 2013 NCAA Division I Tennis Championships.

Individual national championships – Singles

Individual national championships – Doubles

Individual records 

 Note: No doubles team has won more than two titles; however, the following players have won three doubles titles with two or more different partners: Wallace P. Knapp, Yale (1884-85-86); Malcolm Chace, Brown (1893) and Yale (1894–95); Leo Ware, Harvard (1896-97-98); Richard Harte, Harvard (1914-15-16); and Rafael Osuna, Southern California (1961-62-63)
 Most individual titles, career: 6
 Malcolm Chace, Brown/Harvard
 Singles (1893, 1894, and 1895), Doubles (1893, 1894, and 1895)
 Most singles titles, career: 3
 Malcolm Chace, Brown/Harvard (1893, 1894, and 1895)
 Francisco Segura, Miami (FL) (1943, 1944, and 1945)

References

External links
NCAAsports.com
List of NCAA champions

Tennis Men
Tennis tournaments in the United States
College tennis in the United States
College men's tennis in the United States